Valerio Agnoli (born 6 January 1985) is an Italian road bicycle racer, who last rode for UCI WorldTeam .

Career
Agnoli was one of the key domestiques for the Liquigas cycling team, where he was often instrumental in victories for Ivan Basso and Vincenzo Nibali during the Giro d'Italia. Agnoli had a very successful junior and amateur career, taking victories in many prestigious Italian races, including the famous Giro della Lunigiana.

Agnoli wore the white jersey for the best young rider during the 2010 Giro d'Italia, before a crash including his team-mates Ivan Basso and Vincenzo Nibali caused him to lose it.

Agnoli left  at the end of the 2012 season, to follow Nibali and join  on a two-year contract from the 2013 season onwards.

Major results

2003
 1st Overall Giro della Lunigiana
2004
 9th Trofeo Internazionale Bastianelli
 10th Giro della Romagna
2005
 3rd Overall Tour of Qinghai Lake
1st Stage 8
2006
 5th Overall Settimana Ciclistica Lombarda
 7th GP Industria & Artigianato di Larciano
2008
 1st Stage 1 (TTT) Vuelta a España 
 4th Japan Cup
2009
 3rd Memorial Marco Pantani
 7th Japan Cup
 7th Giro del Veneto
2010
 1st Stage 4 (TTT) Giro d'Italia
 10th GP Miguel Induráin
2011
 4th GP Industria & Artigianato di Larciano
2012
 3rd Giro della Toscana
2014
 7th Overall Vuelta a Burgos
 8th Overall Danmark Rundt
2015
 2nd Overall Tour de Langkawi
 4th Clásica de Almería
 9th Overall Settimana Internazionale di Coppi e Bartali
2016
 1st Stage 1 (TTT) Giro del Trentino

Grand Tour general classification results timeline

References

External links

1985 births
Living people
People from Alatri
Cyclists from Lazio
Italian male cyclists
Sportspeople from the Province of Frosinone
21st-century Italian people